Auschwitz Report may refer to:
Auschwitz Protocols, also known as the Auschwitz Reports or Auschwitz Report, a collection of three eyewitness reports about Auschwitz
Vrba–Wetzler report, sometimes referred to alone as the Auschwitz Report
Auschwitz Report (book), a 2006 book about Auschwitz by Leonardo de Benedetti and Primo Levi
The Auschwitz Report, 2021 film

See also 
Pilecki's Report, an official report made earlier than the Auschwitz Protocols, in 1943 by Witold Pilecki